Camp Victory, also known as Camp Casino, was a Royal Netherlands East Indies Army base and prisoner of war camp, used during World War II, near Casino, New South Wales, Australia.

The facility housed prisoners of war, political prisoners and was used for basic training of troops of the Royal Netherlands East Indies Army. The base was in operation from 1942 until 1946.

References
https://www.armidaleexpress.com.au/story/4474470/casino-boys-wait-for-wings/
https://www.armidaleexpress.com.au/story/4521667/camps-troubled-demise/

Military history of the Netherlands
Casino, New South Wales
Former military installations in New South Wales
New South Wales in World War II